Barenthal was a steel company founded in 1947 by Eugène Schall. The company was located in Baerenthal, Lorraine. The company specialized in steel and silver-plated forks and spoons.

Today, Barenthal is owned by the Sino-American holding JH International.

Manufacturing companies of France
Manufacturing companies established in 1947
French companies established in 1947